This is a list of the known extant reptiles of Arizona. The Arizona state reptile is the Arizona ridge-nosed rattlesnake (Crotalus willardi willardi).

Turtles and tortoises

Chelydridae 
Common snapping turtle (Chelydra serpentina)

Emydidae 
Painted turtle (Chrysemys picta)
Desert box turtle (Terrapene ornata luteola)
Red-eared slider (Trachemys scripta elegans)

Kinosternidae 
Arizona mud turtle (Kinosternon stejnegeri)
Yellow mud turtle (Kinosternon flavescens)
Sonora mud turtle (Kinosternon sonoriense)

Testudinidae 
Desert tortoise (Gopherus agassizii)
Sonoran Desert tortoise (Gopherus morafkai)

Trionychidae 
Spiny softshell turtle (Apalone spinifera)

Lizards

Anguidae 
Madrean alligator lizard (Elgaria kingii)

Crotaphytidae

Eublepharidae 
Western banded gecko (Coleonyx variegatus)

Gekkonidae 
Mediterranean house gecko (Hemidactylus turcicus)

Helodermatidae 
Gila monster (Heloderma suspectum)

Iguanidae

Phrynosomatidae

Scincidae

Teiidae

Xantusiidae 
Arizona night lizard (Xantusia arizona)
Bezy's night lizard (Xantusia bezyi)
Desert night lizard (Xantusia vigilis)

Snakes

Boidae 
Desert rosy boa (Lichanura trivirgata)

Colubridae

Elapidae 
Arizona coral snake (Micruroides euryxanthus)

Leptotyphlopidae 
New Mexico threadsnake (Rena dissecta)
Western threadsnake (Rena humilis)

Viperidae 
Sidewinder (Crotalus cerastes)
Western diamondback rattlesnake (Crotalus atrox)

References 

Reptiles
Arizona